The Sun Days is an indie pop band from Gothenburg, Sweden. The group has reached success in Sweden as well as globally, hitting multiple international top lists with their debut, Album.

History

The Sun Days released their first single, "You Can't Make Me Make Up My Mind" in late 2013. In early 2014, they followed up with the second single, "Don't Need to Be Them". After a period of silence, the band released their debut full-length record on 5 June 2015 through Swedish indie label Luxury and Japanese Tower Records. In 2016, Run for Cover Records announced that they were releasing the debut album as a limited LP.

Reception
Stereogum described the band as one of the best new bands in the world. Pitchfork also wrote positively about them following the re-release of single "Don't Need to Be Them" When the music blog Taking The Lead summarized the best albums of 2016, The Sun Days ranked #1 on their list.

Discography
Studio albums
Album - CD (2015, Luxury + Tower Records)
Album - LP (2016, Run for Cover Records) 
Singles
"You Can't Make Me Make Up My Mind" (2013, Luxury)
"Don't Need to Be Them" (2014, Luxury)
"Get Him Off Your Mind" (2014, Luxury)
"Busy People" (2015, Luxury)

Members
 Lea Rambell - vocals
 Simon Boontham - guitar
 Joe Enocsson -  guitar / vocals
 Erik Bjarnar - drums
 Johan Ramnebrink - bass

References

External links
 
 
 The Sun Days at Bandcamp
 http://luxxury.se

Run for Cover Records artists